Aye Aye Thin (23 September 1945 – 17 December 2020) was a two-time Myanmar Academy Award-winning Burmese actress and singer.

Aye won her first Best supporting actress Myanmar Academy Award in 1971 with the film Maya Htaunggyauk (မာယာထောင်ချောက်) and in 1973 with the film Za Khan Si Naukkwe Hma (ဇာခန်းစီးနောက်ကွယ်မှာ).

Death
She died of a heart attack on 17 December 2020.

References

1945 births
2020 deaths
Burmese film actresses